Lincoln Public Library may refer to:

in the United States (by state then city)
Lincoln Public Library (Lincoln, California), listed on the NRHP in Placer County, California
Lincoln Public Library (Lincoln, Illinois), listed on the NRHP in Logan County, Illinois
Lincoln Carnegie Library, Lincoln, Kansas, listed on the NRHP in Lincoln County, Kansas
Lincoln Public Library (Lincoln, Massachusetts)
Lincoln County Library, Lincolnton, Georgia